Jian Kellett Liew, known professionally as Kyson, is an Australian singer, songwriter, and producer.

Early life

Liew was born in Adelaide, Australia. He later moved to Sydney, Australia where he went on to study a degree in audio engineering. After graduating, he spent the next several years in Berlin working as a musician and sound artist under the name Kyson and various other monikers.

Career

In 2012, Kyson gained attention for his remix of Bon Iver's "Holocene" on 4AD Records. On 29 October 2012 Liew released his "Blackstone EP" on Moodgadget Recordings.  He was signed by Friends of Friends Records and released his first studio album The Water's Way.

In 2015, Kyson, alongside Italian musician and producer Matteo Pavesi, co-produced the debut album of singer-songwriter Alice Phoebe Lou, which was released on 13 May 2016. The same year, Liew founded the art and music collective Average Negative with musical collaborator Chris Hill.

In April 2016, Liew released his second album, A Book of Flying, with Friends of Friends Recordings.

In 2018 Kyson released a series of AA singles, "Every High / Clear Air" and "Have My Back / Forest Green", in collaboration with B3SCI Records and Majestic Casual Records. The two releases were also part of a limited edition white vinyl record, with artwork by B.D. Graft.

Pitchfork has described Liew's style as, "combin[ing] soft touches of electronic keys and rickety, pinprick rhythms, with his half-whispered lyrics and drifting melodies wrapped in sheets of textural field recordings." Liew has also been described as having an, "enigmatic sound, a blend of indie, acoustic and electronic music."

Collaborations

In 2014, Liew collaborated with Detroit-based musician Shigeto on the track "Water Collides". In 2017, he collaborated with Australian artist Amber Cronin to create the spatial installation "Sawaru" at the Nexus Gallery in Adelaide, Australia.

References

Living people
Australian electronic musicians
Year of birth missing (living people)